Charles Yarnall Abbott (September 23, 1870June 24, 1938) was an American photographer and painter.

Early life
Charles Yarnall Abbott was born on September 23, 1870, in Philadelphia, to Sarah (Yarnall) and William Holloway Abbott, an attorney. He grew up in Philadelphia. He originally went to college to study law. He graduated from the University of Pennsylvania Law School in 1892. He was a lawyer for ten years before becoming an artist.

Mid-life and career
Abbott became interested in the arts while working as a lawyer. First, he gained interest in photography, followed by an interest for painting. He quit working in law and went to study painting. He studied at the Pennsylvania Academy of Fine Arts, training under Thomas Anshutz. He relocated to Paris, France. He studied at the Académie Colarossi. There, he trained under Raphael Collin and Gustave Courtois. He returned from Paris and moved to Rose Valley, Pennsylvania. He married Elenore Abbott in 1898. Abbott fathered one child with Elenore, Marjorie (1907-?).

Some of Abbott's pictures appeared in Camera Work.

The couple relocated to Philadelphia in 1913. Abbott also worked in Rockport, Massachusetts. He co-founded the Rockport Art Association. Starting in 1916, his work was featured in the Pennsylvania Academy of Fine Arts Annual Exhibition, until he died.

Later life and legacy
He served as president of the Philadelphia Sketch Club and the Philadelphia Art Alliance. His work was exhibited at the Art Institute of Chicago and Corcoran Gallery. He lectured and wrote about art appreciation. His work was published in Encyclopædia Britannica. Abbott also was a playwright. He died in 1938. His work is held in the collections of the National Media Museum, the Art Gallery of New South Wales and the National Gallery of Canada.

Abbott died on June 24, 1938, in Philadelphia.

References

1870 births
1938 deaths
19th-century American painters
19th-century American photographers
19th-century American male artists
20th-century American painters
20th-century American photographers
Académie Colarossi alumni
American expatriates in France
American male painters
Artists from Philadelphia
Pennsylvania Academy of the Fine Arts alumni
University of Pennsylvania Law School alumni
20th-century American male artists